Herbert Jackson 'Harry' Laxton (22 August 1879 – 16 January 1947) was an Australian rules footballer who played with Essendon in the Victorian Football League (VFL).

His younger brother, Charlie Laxton, played for Collingwood.

Notes

External links 

1879 births
1947 deaths
Australian rules footballers from Victoria (Australia)
Essendon Football Club players
West Melbourne Football Club players
Australian rules footballers from Adelaide